Nasi timbel is an Indonesian hot dish, consisting of steamed rice wrapped inside a banana leaf. It is a traditional Sundanese cuisine from West Java. The heat of the hot-cooked rice touches the banana leaf and produces a unique aroma. It is made in ways similar to making lontong; compressed, rolled, and wrapped in banana leaves; it then evolves into a complete dish served with various side dishes such as fried chicken, empal gepuk (fried beef), jambal roti (salted fish), tahu goreng, tempeh, salted duck egg, sayur asem, with lalab and sambal. Nasi timbel later evolved to nasi bakar.

See also 

Nasi bakar
Nasi bogana
Nasi lemak
Nasi liwet
Nasi tutug oncom
Nasi uduk

References

External links

Nasi Timbel recipes (in Indonesian)

Indonesian rice dishes